Church of the Visitation of the Blessed Virgin Mary is a historic Roman Catholic church in Kraków, Poland; located at ul. Karmelicka 19 street in the Old Town. It is the city's first Carmelite Church, hence the name of the street on which it stands.

History 
According to legend, the earliest church on the same site was founded in the 11th century by Duke Władysław I Herman after a vision led him to this spot northwest of the city walls, where he found blooming violets in sand which cured him of a disfiguring case of scurvy. The sand gave the church its alternative name, the Carmelite Church in Piasek. However, the first attested church building was begun in 1395 on the initiative of Jadwiga of Poland and Władysław Jagiełło. On the outside wall of the church along Garbarska Street there's a stone with a footprint carved into it, allegedly set by the Queen herself. The church was handed over in 1397 to the Carmelite Order recently invited by the Polish monarchs from Prague. The Gothic church was largely destroyed during the Swedish Deluge and was rebuilt in a Baroque style in the second half of the 17th century and consecrated in 1679. On August 15, 1683, Jan III Sobieski said his final prayers in Kraków at this church before setting out for his victorious Battle of Vienna against the Ottoman Empire.  When the Confederacy of Bar seized control of the Old Town of Kraków in 1772, Russian troops used the church (just outside the Old Town walls) as an artillery sighting platform, leading to considerable damage. In 1997, Pope John Paul II raised the church to the status of a minor basilica.

Architecture and interiors 
The Baroque facade of the church is based on the design of Il Gesù in Rome. On the south-side wall of the church, at the corner of ul. Garbarska, there is the 18th century sculpture representing Golgotha with its central Crucificion. The main altar depicts the Visitation of Saint Elizabeth by Virgin Mary, and is one of the largest examples of Baroque woodcarving in Kraków. The most famous work of art in the church is the icon of Our Lady of Piasek, which can be found in a chapel on the south side of the nave.  According to legend, the icon is reputed to have been miraculously completed when left unfinished by its original artist in the 15th century. It survived unscathed even during the destruction of the majority of the walls around it by the Swedes.   It was later fitted with a crown designed by the artist Jan Matejko, whose own wedding was held here in 1864.

Behind the church, now completely hidden from outside view by the surrounding buildings, there is still a surviving fragment of the old Carmelite orchard.

See also

Churches of Kraków

References

Further reading

 Ryszard Burek (ed). Encyclopedia Krakowa (2000) pp. 461–462
 Michał Rożek, "Kościół OO. Karmelitów na Piasku w Krakowie" (1990)

Visitation
17th-century Roman Catholic church buildings in Poland
Baroque church buildings in Poland